This is an (incomplete) list of former equipment used by the Estonian Army (Maavägi:) prior to World War 2.

Armor
Tanks
12 FT-17 light tank
4 Mark V heavy tank
6 TKS tankette
Armored cars
13 Arsenal Crossley armored car
Anti-tank weapons
44 Rheinmetall 37mm Pak 36 L/50 anti-tank gun      (Note:The Estonian Rheinmetall gun had a longer barrel length compared to Wehrmacht standard L/45.)
4 Bohler 47 mm anti-tank gun model 1935  
15 Solothurn-Arsenal 20 mm antitank gun
TM-34; TM 37; anti-tank mines: ~12,000

Artillery
Cannons
98 Russian 76 mm divisional gun M1902; 
59 British 84mm Ordnance QF 18 pounder; 
20 Russian [Schneider] 107 mm gun M1910; 
23 British 110 mm QF 4.5 inch Howitzers; 
8 German 15 cm sFH 13 howitzers; 
29 Russian [Schneider] 152 mm howitzer M1910;
Anti Aircraft Guns
12 M38 Madsen 20 mm anti-aircraft cannon 
16 37mm Rheinmetall-Borsig (Flak 18), 40mm (Bofors M36) anti-aircraft cannon
 8  7.5 cm Krupp (Flak L/60) anti-aircraft cannon
116 tripod mounted anti-aircraft machineguns 
Mortars
34 mortars: 81.4mm Brandt mle 27/31

Infantry weapons
Pistols and rifles
Pistols: Nagant M1895: 900, Browning FN Model 1903: ~4,600 (Replaced by ~5,300 Browning Hi-Power P35 in 1938) 
Rifles: Russian Mosin–Nagant M1891: 72,000, British Pattern 1914 Enfield: 46,000, Japanese Arisaka Types 30 and 38: 24,000  
Submachine guns
Tallinn Model 1923 Arsenal submachine gun: ~600, (Replaced by ~500 Suomi M/31 submachine guns in 1938) 
Machine guns
Russian Maxim PM M1910: ~1,600, British Lewis Gun: ~1,200, Danish Madsen machine gun M1920: ~1,700
Grenades
Hand grenades: ~133,000
Electronics
Field Radios: 133

See also
 Military of Estonia
 Equipment of the Maavägi

References

Military equipment of Estonia